RG, Rg or rg may refer to:

People
 Pete RG (fl. 1998–2015), an American singer-songwriter
 Razor Ramon RG or Makoto Izubuchi (born 1974), a Japanese professional wrestler
 RG Sharma (born 1987), an Indian international cricketer
 RG Snyman (born 1995), South African rugby union player

Places
 RG postcode area, the postal address for the area of Reading and surrounding towns in England
 Province of Ragusa, Sicily, Italy, vehicle registration prefix

Science and technology

Computing and telecommunications
 Radio Guide, used to specify Coaxial cables (including a list of RG cable types)
 ReplayGain, a proposed standard for normalizing the perceived loudness of digital audio playback
 ResearchGate, a social network for scientists and researchers

Military
 RG-6 grenade launcher, a Russian weapon
 RG-42, a Russian fragmentation grenade
 armored vehicles designed by Land Systems OMC, South Africa (including a list of RG-type vehicles)

Other uses in science and technology
 RG, or Rail Gourmet, a food brand and a division of SSP Group
 Radius of gyration, several related measures of the size of an object, a surface, or an ensemble of points
 Reachability Graph, a formal verification technique
 Renormalization group, in physics, a mathematical apparatus allowing investigation of a system at different size scales
 RG color space, a color space
 rg chromaticity, a two-dimensional color space in which there is no intensity information
 Rhamnogalacturonans, a type of pectin
 Roentgenium, symbol Rg, a chemical element

Sport
 RG Heidelberg, a rugby union club from Heidelberg, Germany
 Rhythmic gymnastics
 Right guard, a position in American football

Other uses
 Direction centrale des renseignements généraux or Renseignements Généraux, a defunct French interior intelligence agency
 Ibanez RG, a series of electric guitars produced by Hoshino Gakki
 r > g, an economics equation fundamental to Capital in the Twenty-First Century
 Regional Gathering, an event hosted by local chapters of American Mensa
 RG Financial Corporation, a financial holding company located in San Juan, Puerto Rico
 RG Line, a Finnish shipping company
 RG Veda, a Japanese manga first published in 1989
 Röhm Gesellschaft or RG, a German brand of firearms (including a list of RG-type models)
 Rossiyskaya Gazeta, a Russian newspaper
 Varig (1927-2006), Brazilian airline (IATA code RG)
 A RG (Roof Garden) level in a building, also called Lower Penthouse (LPH) or a level where there is a rooftop garden in some buildings

See also
 RG1 (disambiguation)
 RG2 (disambiguation)
 RG3 (disambiguation)
 Rio Grande (disambiguation)